Roger Clifford or Roger de Clifford may refer to:

 Roger de Clifford (died c. 1285)
 Roger de Clifford (died 1282) (died 1282), the son of the above

Roger de Clifford, 2nd Baron de Clifford (1299–1322)
Roger de Clifford, 5th Baron de Clifford (1333–1389)
Sir Roger Clifford, 7th Baronet (born 1936)

See also
Clifford (surname)
Clifford baronets